Sportgemeinschaft Bad Breisig, abbreviated SG Bad Breisig, is a German association football club based in Bad Breisig, a small town near Bad Neuenahr-Ahrweiler in northern Rhineland-Palatinate. The club also has departments for athletics, badminton, gymnastics, Jujitsu, and scuba diving.

History
The club was established in 1988 through the merger of Sportfreunde Germania Oberbreisig and Sportverein Niederbreisig. The combined side advanced to the Verbandsliga Rheinland (V) in 2004. The 2007–08 season was the most successful in the short history of SG as they advanced to the semi-final of the Rheinland Pokal (Rhineland Cup) and won promotion to the Oberliga Südwest (V). The club attempted twice to establish itself in the Oberliga but on both occasions was relegated again to the Rheinlandliga. A last-place finish in the Rheinlandliga in 2015–16 saw the club relegated to the Bezirksliga.

Since 2004 the position of club chairman has been held by Guido Ernst, a politician and spokesperson for the Christian Democratic Union, the country's largest political party.

Honours
The club's honours:
 Rheinlandliga
 Runners-up: 2007, 2008, 2010
 Bezirksliga Rheinland-Mitte
 Champions: 2004

Recent seasons
The recent season-by-season performance of the club:

With the introduction of the Regionalligas in 1994 and the 3. Liga in 2008 as the new third tier, below the 2. Bundesliga, all leagues below dropped one tier.

Stadium
The footballers play their home fixtures at the Rheintalstadion Am weißen Kreuz.

References

External links
Official team site
SG Bad Breisig at Weltfussball.de
Das deutsche Fußball-Archiv historical German domestic league tables 

Football clubs in Germany
Football clubs in Rhineland-Palatinate
Association football clubs established in 1988
1988 establishments in West Germany